Max Embarrassing 2 is a 2011 Danish comedy film directed by . It is a sequel to the 2008 film Max Embarrassing.

Cast
  as Max (as Samuel Heller)
  as Mor (as Mette Horn)
 Lars Bom as Steen Cold
  as Marianne
 Anders Hove as Mogens
  as Clavs
 Faysal Mobahriz as Hassan
  as Esther
 Luca d'Apuzzo Poulsen as Oliver
 Louise Mieritz as Ulla

References

External links
 

2011 films
2011 comedy films
2010s Danish-language films
Danish comedy films